Márcio Antônio Rossini, best known as Márcio Rossini (born 20 September 1960) is a Brazilian former  football (soccer) player who played as a defender, best known for his performances for Santos Futebol Clube and the Brazil national team.

Honours
Santos
 Campeonato Paulista: 1984

Individual
 Bola de Prata : 1983

References

1960 births
Living people
1983 Copa América players
Brazil international footballers
Brazilian footballers
Campeonato Brasileiro Série A players
Santos FC players
Association football defenders